Nizamuddin Sihalivi Qadari Ansari (Urdu: نظام الدین سہالوی) was the founder and designer of the Dars-i Nizami curriculum used in many Asian madrassas. He was born in Sihali a Village in Fatehpur Block in Barabanki District of Uttar Pradesh now in India, on 27 March 1677 then migrated to Firangi Mahal Lukhnow.
His father was Mulla Qatubdeen.
He was a disciple of Shah Abdul Razzaq Bansvi in silsala Qadiriyya. He was a descendant of Abu Ayyub al-Ansari.

Notable work
Dars-i Nizami
He designed and introduced teaching course Dars-i-Nizami in 1748

References

Hanafis
Maturidis
19th-century Indian Muslims
Indian reformers
19th-century Indian philosophers
Muslim reformers
Founders of Indian schools and colleges
Indian philanthropists
Theistic evolutionists